Government Intermediate Colleges (GICs) are central government secondary schools in the Indian states of Uttar Pradesh, Uttarakhand and Andhra Pradesh. For instance there are 19 GICs in Andhra Pradesh.

See also
 Government Inter College Faizabad
 Government Inter College Deoria
 GSIC, Rajesultanpur

References

External links
 Education Boards in India
 Board of High School and Intermediate Education Uttar Pradesh

Intermediate colleges in Uttar Pradesh
Educational institutions in India with year of establishment missing